Franz Worisch (17 May 1926 – 7 August 1989) was an Austrian diver. He competed at the 1948 Summer Olympics and the 1952 Summer Olympics.

References

1926 births
1989 deaths
Austrian male divers
Olympic divers of Austria
Divers at the 1948 Summer Olympics
Divers at the 1952 Summer Olympics
Divers from Vienna
20th-century Austrian people